Rops may refer to:

People

 Daniel-Rops (1901–1965), French writer and historian
 Félicien Rops (1833–1898), Belgian artist

Places

 Rops (peak), a mountain in Kosovo

Sports

 Rovaniemen Palloseura (RoPS), a Finnish football club

Technology

 Rollover protection structure, a system or structure intended to protect equipment operators and motorists from injuries caused by vehicle overturns or rollovers
 Runway Overrun Prevention System, a technology used in the Airbus A350 XWB
 Render output unit (or raster operations pipeline, ROP), a feature of graphics cards

See also
 ROP (disambiguation)
 Rop (name)